Military.com is a website that provides news and information about the United States military, service members, veterans, and their families as well as foreign policy and broader national security issues.

Founded in 1999, the site has been a division of Monster Worldwide since 2004. Among the company's revenue streams are advertising, veteran employment, and lead generation.

About 10 million people have registered on the site, according to the company. 

The site offers daily news, investigations and feature reporting, and a dozen newsletters. Sub-channels include information for spouses, resources to use the GI Bill, and entertainment and fitness. Military.com also offers three apps on iOS and Android: Military News App, Military Pay App and Transition App to help servicemembers move to civilian life. In addition, the website also produces several podcasts, including its news program Fire Watch.

History
The website was founded by Christopher Michel in 1999 and went live in 2000. Its advisory board originally included two former members of the Joint Chiefs of Staff, as well as other academic and business leaders. In 2004, Military.com was acquired by Monster Worldwide in 2004 for around $39.5 million. In August 2016, Ranstad Holding acquired Monster Worldwide.

Previous presidents of Military.com include Greg Smith, a retired U.S. Navy rear admiral who was president of Military.com and a vice-president at Monster from November 2014 to August 2017, and Terry McCreary, a retired rear admiral who was president of the company from 2010 to 2014.

Newsroom 
Military.com's news team includes:
 Zachary Fryer-Biggs, who became the Managing Editor in 2021 and has been a national security journalist for more than a decade. During that time, he has served as Newsweek’s Pentagon reporter and an investigative reporter covering national security for the Center for Public Integrity, among other positions. His work has appeared in The Washington Post, The Atlantic, Reveal, The Daily Beast, and other outlets.
 Travis Tritten, who is the deputy managing editor and Pentagon bureau chief for Military.com. He has 20 years of experience reporting on the military, government and politics in the U.S. and abroad. Since 2014, Tritten has reported from Washington, D.C., spending most of his time at the Pentagon and Capitol Hill. Previously, he was a senior defense reporter for Bloomberg Government, a defense and national security reporter at the Washington Examiner, and a reporter with Stars and Stripes, including seven years as a Japan correspondent.
Steve Beynon, who is a reporter for Military.com based in Washington D.C. He specializes in covering ground combat. An Afghanistan war veteran, serving over a decade as a cavalry scout, he currently serves as a non-commissioned officer in the National Guard. He previously covered Capitol Hill and the Department of Veterans Affairs for Stars and Stripes. His work has also appeared in Politico, The Washington Examiner, National Guard Magazine and Military Times. In his hometown of Cincinnati, Steve wrote for the Cincinnati Enquirer and worked at Fox 19..
 Drew F. Lawrence, who is a reporter and producer for Military.com, covering breaking news and serving as producer and co-host of Fire Watch. He joined Military.com from a fellowship at CNN where he covered military issues and produced content for shows like The Lead with Jake Tapper. Prior to journalism, Drew spent four years in the Army as an Armor Officer.
 Rebecca Kheel, who is a congressional reporter for Military.com and co-host of Fire Watch. She previously worked as a defense reporter for The Hill, covering all things defense from the view at the Capitol, including negotiations over annual defense authorization and appropriations bills, fights about the foreign policy crisis of the day and more. Prior to coming to D.C., she was a local reporter at the Orange County Register in California, writing about everything from disputes over new housing developments to the latest theme park ride openings.
 Patricia Kime, who focuses on military personnel and veterans issues for Military.com, reporting on health care, military families, justice and benefits. She previously was a senior writer for Military Times, specializing in health care and medicine. Her work has appeared in The Washington Post, The New York Times, USA Today, Kaiser Health News and elsewhere. She was named as one of the top 100 influencers in the veterans' arena by HillVets in 2015 and earned first place for beat reporting from the Association of Health Care Journalists in 2019. Prior to becoming a journalist, she worked for the federal government in the intelligence community
 Thomas Novelly who is a reporter for Military.com focusing on coverage of the Air Force and Space Force. He previously covered veterans, military bases and federal politics in South Carolina for The Post and Courier as well as breaking news for the Courier-Journal in Louisville, Kentucky.
 Konstantin Toropin, who is a reporter for Military.com specializing in coverage of the Navy and Marine Corps. He is also a US Navy veteran, having served five years in the surface fleet as a signals intelligence analyst. He has previously covered breaking national news for CNN, reporting on everything from protests to hurricanes from the field and the newsroom. Toropin's coverage also included investigative work on false 2020 campaign claims and food processing plants amidst the pandemic.
 Richard Sisk, who has more than 45 years of journalism experience in reporting and editing in the U.S. and abroad for United Press International, the N.Y. Daily News and now for Military.com. He has covered police beats, the courts, transportation and politics in New York City and Washington, D.C., and had numerous assignments in the Mideast, Europe and Latin America. Sisk is a Vietnam veteran who served with the 2nd Battalion, Fourth Marines, in 1967-68.

Criticisms
Military.com has been criticized for taking advertising from for-profit colleges. Its former partner in lead generation, QuinStreet, previously settled with the U.S. government after being accused of preying on veterans. Military.com ended its relationship with QuinStreet in 2019.

References

External links
Military.com home page

Military-themed websites
Internet properties established in 1999
American news websites
Monster.com
1999 establishments in the United States